Morgan Feeney (born 8 February  1999) is an English professional footballer who plays as a defender for League Two club Carlisle United.

Career
In November 2017, Feeney made his senior debut at the age of 18 in a UEFA Europa League match against Atalanta. On 31 January 2020, Feeney joined League One side Tranmere Rovers on loan until the end of the season. He made just one appearance for Tranmere, having picked up a hamstring injury on his debut.

After leaving Everton, Feeney signed for League One club Sunderland on a short-term deal on 21 August 2020. On 8 September 2020, he scored on his debut for Sunderland in an EFL Trophy tie against Aston Villa U21s. His contract, due to expire in January 2021, will not be renewed. Sunderland manager Lee Johnson explained this with financial uncertainty arising from the coronavirus pandemic.

On 20 January 2021, Feeney joined League Two side Carlisle United on a short-term contract until the end of the 2020–21 season.

Career statistics

Club

Honours 
Everton U23s

 Premier League Cup: 2018–19

References

External links
Everton profile
England profile at The Football Association

1999 births
Living people
England youth international footballers
English Football League players
Everton F.C. players
Tranmere Rovers F.C. players
Sunderland A.F.C. players
Carlisle United F.C. players
Sportspeople from Bootle
Association football defenders
English footballers